This is a list of butterflies of Réunion. About 28 species are known from Réunion, three of which are endemic.

Papilionidae

Papilioninae

Papilionini
Papilio demodocus Esper, [1798]
Papilio phorbanta Linnaeus, 1771 (endemic)

Pieridae

Coliadinae
Eurema floricola ceres (Butler, 1886)
Eurema brigitta pulchella (Boisduval, 1833)
Catopsilia florella (Fabricius, 1775)
Catopsilia thauruma (Reakirt, 1866)

Lycaenidae

Miletinae
Spalgis tintinga (Boisduval, 1833)

Theclinae

Theclini
Deudorix antalus (Hopffer, 1855)

Polyommatinae

Polyommatini
Luthrodes pandava (Horsfield, 1829)
Cacyreus darius (Mabille, 1877)
Cacyreus marshalli Butler, 1897
Lampides boeticus (Linnaeus, 1767)
Leptomyrina phidias (Fabricius, 1793)
Leptotes pirithous (Linnaeus, 1767)
Zizeeria knysna (Trimen, 1862)
Zizina antanossa (Mabille, 1877)
Zizula hylax (Fabricius, 1775)

Nymphalidae

Danainae

Danaini
Danaus plexippus (Linnaeus, 1758)
Danaus chrysippus orientis (Aurivillius, 1909)
Euploea goudotii Boisduval, 1833 (endemic)

Satyrinae

Melanitini
Melanitis leda (Linnaeus, 1758)

Satyrini
Heteropsis narcissus narcissus (Fabricius, 1798)
Heteropsis narcissus borbonica (Oberthür, 1916)

Nymphalinae

Nymphalini
Antanartia borbonica (Oberthür, 1879)
Vanessa cardui (Linnaeus, 1758)
Junonia rhadama (Boisduval, 1833)
Salamis augustina Boisduval, 1833
Hypolimnas misippus (Linnaeus, 1764)

Limenitinae

Neptidini
Neptis dumetorum Boisduval, 1833 (endemic)

Heliconiinae

Vagrantini
Phalanta phalantha aethiopica (Rothschild & Jordan, 1903)

Hesperiidae

Coeliadinae
 Coeliades ernesti (Grandidier, 1867)
 Coeliades forestan (Stoll, [1782])

Pyrginae

Tagiadini
Eagris sabadius (Gray, 1832)

Hesperiinae

Baorini
Borbo borbonica (Boisduval, 1833)
Parnara naso bigutta Evans, 1937

See also
List of moths of Réunion
Wildlife of Réunion

References

Reunion
Reunion
Butterflies
Butterflies
Butterflies of Africa